Concejo de Bogotá is a station that is part of the mass transit system TransMilenio.

Location 
It is located on the Avenue El Dorado between the 37th and the Avenida NQS. It is accessed through a pedestrian bridge located on NQS Avenue.

Serves the demand of the neighborhoods the Soledad, the Americas, Great America and its surroundings.

Nearby are the District Administrative Center (CAD), SupeCADE CAD and the Bogota Council.

Etymology 
The station receives its name because it is located near the establishment of the council of Bogotá, it is also next to the Plaza de la Democracia, located east of the station to which it is located in the depression that passes along 26th Street below the Avenue of the Americas. Before 2010, 26th Street passed through a bridge that was demolished to make way for the plaza and the depressed.

In this area of public space is located the monument Ala Solar of the Venezuelan Alejandro Otero.

From September 2018, it was renamed the Concejo de Bogotá.

History 
This station is part of Phase III of TransMilenio, which began to be built in late 2009 and, after several delays related to corruption cases, was delivered in mid-2012.

Current Trunk Services

Dual services

See also 
 Bogotá
 TransMilenio
 List of TransMilenio Stations

References 

TransMilenio